Dirk Huysmans (born 3 September 1973) is a Belgian former professional footballer who played as a midfielder. He made one appearance for the Belgium national team in 1995.

Honours
Lierse
 Belgian First Division: 1996–97
 Belgian Super Cup: 1999

References

External links
 

1973 births
Living people
Belgian footballers
Association football midfielders
Belgium international footballers
Belgium youth international footballers
Belgium under-21 international footballers
Belgian Pro League players
Lierse S.K. players
Standard Liège players
Beerschot A.C. players
K.V. Mechelen players
K. Lyra players
K. Berchem Sport players
Place of birth missing (living people)